Thomas Smith (May 1, 1799 – April 12, 1876) was an American tradesman who served three terms as a member of the United States House of Representatives from Indiana from 1839 to 1841, and again from 1843 to 1847.

Biography 
Smith was born in Fayette County, Pennsylvania.  In 1818, he moved to Rising Sun, Indiana, where he learned the trade of tanning.  He then moved to Versailles, Indiana in 1821 and established a tanyard.

Political career 
Smith eventually became a colonel in the state militia, and member of the Indiana House of Representatives in 1829, 1830, and from 1833 to 1836.  He also served in the state senate from 1836 to 1839.

Smith was elected as a Democratic Representative for Indiana's 4th congressional district to the Twenty-Sixth Congress, which lasted from March 4, 1839 until March 3, 1841.  He was an unsuccessful candidate for election in 1840 to the Twenty-seventh Congress, but was elected in Indiana's 3rd congressional district to the Twenty-eighth and Twenty-ninth Congresses (March 4, 1843 – March 3, 1847).  He was not a candidate for renomination in 1846.

Later career and death 
Smith was a delegate to the Indiana constitutional convention in 1850.

Smith died in Versailles, Indiana aged 76 and was interred in Cliff Hill Cemetery.

Democratic Party Indiana state senators
Democratic Party members of the Indiana House of Representatives
People from Fayette County, Pennsylvania
1799 births
1876 deaths
Democratic Party members of the United States House of Representatives from Indiana
People from Rising Sun, Indiana
Military personnel from Indiana
19th-century American politicians